Jedľové Kostoľany is a village and municipality in Zlaté Moravce District of the Nitra Region, in western-central Slovakia.

History
In historical records the village was first mentioned in 1387.

Geography
The municipality lies at an altitude of 409 metres and covers an area of 27.294 km². It has a population of about 1010 people.

See also
 List of municipalities and towns in Slovakia

References

Genealogical resources

The records for genealogical research are available at the state archive "Statny Archiv in Nitra, Slovakia"

 Roman Catholic church records (births/marriages/deaths): 1762-1904 (parish A)

External links
Official homepage
Information in English on www.e-obce.sk
Surnames of living people in Jedlove Kostolany

Villages and municipalities in Zlaté Moravce District